Lemlem Hailu (born 21 May 2001) is an Ethiopian middle- and long-distance runner. She is the 2022 World indoor champion at the 3000 metres from Belgrade 22. Hailu represented Ethiopia in the women's 1500 metres at the 2019 World Championships and the 2020 Tokyo Olympics.

At 16, she was the 1500m 2017 World Youth champion to take bronze at the Youth Olympic Games a year later, and bronze at the African Games in 2019. Hailu holds the current world under-20 record for the indoor 1500 metres.

Career
At age 16, Lemlem Hailu gained first international experience at the 2017 World Youth Championships in Nairobi, where she won the 1500 metres event. A year later, she took gold over the distance at the African Youth Games held in Algiers and went to Argentina for Youth Olympic Games in Buenos Aires, where she earned bronze in a combined 1500m event.

In 2019, she captured the bronze medal for the 1500m at the African Games. Hailu represented Ethiopia in the event at the 2019 World Championships in Doha, reaching the semi-finals.

In February 2020, she set a world under-20 record for the indoor 1500 metres with a time of 4:01.79, breaking by 0.02 s previous mark set by her compatriot Gudaf Tsegay in 2016. The same month, Hailu improved her record to 4m 1.57s, which was her fourth personal best achieved within three weeks. In October, she won the 1500m race at the Kip Keino Classic.

In 2021, Hailu secured an overall 3000m World Indoor Tour victory, winning two top-level meets. She won the event at the Meeting Hauts-de-France Pas-de-Calais in Liévin, and the Copernicus Cup in Toruń. At the delayed 2020 Tokyo Olympics, Hailu was eliminated in the semi-finals of the 1500m event.

The next year, Hailu became the 3000m World indoor champion in Belgrade with a season's best of 8:41.82. Elle Purrier St. Pierre won silver in 8:42.04 while Hailu's compatriot Ejgayehu Taye was third in 8:42.23.

Achievements

International competitions

Circuit wins, and National titles
 World Athletics Indoor Tour 3000 m overall winner: 2021, 2023
 2021 (3000 m): Liévin Meeting Hauts-de-France Pas-de-Calais, Toruń Copernicus Cup
 2023 (3000 m): Karlsruhe Init Indoor Meeting
 World Athletics Continental Tour
 2020 (1500 m): Nairobi Kip Keino Classic
 Ethiopian Athletics Championships
 1500 metres: 2019, 2021

Personal bests
 1500 metres – 4:00.32 (Castellón 2022)
 1500 metres indoor – 4:01.57 (Liévin 2020) World U20 record
 3000 metres – 8:34.03 (Doha 2019)
 3000 metres indoor – 8:29.28 (Madrid 2021)
 5000 metres – 14:44.73 (Eugene 2022)

References

External links

Ethiopian female middle-distance runners
2001 births
Living people
World Athletics Championships athletes for Ethiopia
Athletes (track and field) at the 2018 Summer Youth Olympics
African Games medalists in athletics (track and field)
African Games bronze medalists for Ethiopia
Athletes (track and field) at the 2018 African Youth Games
Athletes (track and field) at the 2019 African Games
World Youth Championships in Athletics winners
Ethiopian Athletics Championships winners
Athletes (track and field) at the 2020 Summer Olympics
Olympic athletes of Ethiopia
World Athletics Indoor Championships winners
World Athletics Indoor Championships medalists
21st-century Ethiopian women